The University of Applied Sciences Northwestern Switzerland (FHNW) is a university of applied sciences in Switzerland. It is one of the largest universities in the country in terms of student enrollment. It is an inter-cantonal public law institution with its own legal personality. The cantons are Aargau, Basel-Landschaft, Basel-Stadt, and Solothurn.

As part of the state treaty, the supporting cantons manage the FHNW with a fourfold performance mandate. This includes training and further education, application-oriented research and development as well as services for the benefit of third parties.

History

The FHNW was founded on January 1, 2006, based on a state treaty between the cantons of Aargau, Basel-Landschaft, Basel-Stadt, and Solothurn. It was created from the merger of the Aargau University of Applied Sciences (FHA), the Basel University of Applied Sciences (FHBB), the Solothurn University of Applied Sciences (FHSO), and the Basel University of Education and Social Work and the Solothurn University of Education.

Courses and students

The courses are characterized by their practical relevance and are offered as full and/or part-time studies. The FHNW offers 29 bachelor's and 17 master's courses in the fields of applied psychology, architecture, construction and geomatics, design and art, life sciences, music, teacher training, social work, technology, and business.

In further education, Master of Advanced Studies (MAS), Executive Master of Business Administration (EMBA), Diploma of Advanced Studies (DAS), Certificate of Advanced Studies (CAS) as well as specialist seminars and conferences are offered.

Development of student numbers (students enrolled as of October 15, excluding continuing education).

Organisation

The strategic management body of the FHNW is the Fachhochschule Council, which is elected by the governments of the supporting cantons. Operationally, the FHNW is managed by the executive committee (Crispino Bergamaschi) and the Directorate.

The overall supervision of the FHNW is exercised by the parliaments of the four supporting cantons. They set up an Interparliamentary Commission (IPK). The four cantonal governments are responsible for joint supervision of the FHNW, and their business is prepared by the government committee and the four directors of education. Financial supervision is carried out by the financial controls of the supporting cantons.

The FHNW consists of nine universities (* = main location)

University of Applied Psychology FHNW (Olten*)
University of Architecture, Civil Engineering and Geomatics FHNW (Muttenz*)
University of Art and Design FHNW (Basel*)
University of Life Sciences FHNW (Muttenz*)
University of Music FHNW (Basel*)
University of Education FHNW (Muttenz, Solothurn, Windisch*)
University of Social Work FHNW (Muttenz, Olten*)
University of Applied Sciences FHNW (Muttenz, Olten, Windisch*)
FHNW School of Economics (Basel, Windisch, Olten*)

References

Universities in Switzerland
Universities established in the 2000s
2006 establishments in Switzerland